Marilopteryx is a genus of moths of the family Noctuidae.

Species
 Marilopteryx carancahua Blanchard & Franclemont, 1982
 Marilopteryx lamptera (Druce, 1890)
 Marilopteryx lutina (Smith, 1902)

References
Natural History Museum Lepidoptera genus database
Marilopteryx at funet

Hadeninae